The Colombian Space Commission (CSC) is Colombia’s government body for the promotion and use of space. It is in charge of promoting the development of space technology and communication satellites as well as applications for the navigation and maritime transportation in Colombia. It also works in the observation and surveillance of the country's natural resources. It was created by presidential decree No. 2442 in July 2006. although there have been some Americans of Colombian descent who have gone into space such as George D. Zamka.

Colombian artificial satellites 
 Libertad I, 2007
 FACSAT-1, 2018

See also 
 List of government space agencies

References

External links 
 Colombian Space Commission 

Space agencies
Space program of Colombia
Scientific organisations based in Colombia